Migoplastis correcta is a moth of the subfamily Arctiinae first described by Francis Walker in 1865. It is found in Sri Lanka.

Description
Hindwing of male not excised at anal angle. veins 6 and 7 from cell. The branches of antennae are long. Head and thorax ochreous brown. A black speck on vertex of head present. Two specks on collar, two on each patagium and one each on each thoracic segment can be seen. Abdomen yellowish with a dorsal and two lateral paired series of black spots. Forewing ochreous brown with a wide indistinct post-medial paler band, only defined on the disk. Hindwings are yellowish.

References

 

Arctiini
Moths described in 1865